Next-fit is an online algorithm for bin packing. Its input is a list of items of different sizes. Its output is a packing - a partition of the items into bins of fixed capacity, such that the sum of sizes of items in each bin is at most the capacity. Ideally, we would like to use as few bins as possible, but minimizing the number of bins is an NP-hard problem. The next-fit algorithm uses the following heuristic:

 It keeps a current bin, which is initially empty.
 When an item arrives, it checks whether the item fits into the current bin.
 If it fits, it is placed inside it.
 Otherwise, the current bin is closed, a new bin is opened and the coming item is placed inside this new bin.

Next-Fit is a bounded space algorithm - it requires only one partially-filled bin to be open at any time. The algorithm was studied by David S. Johnson in his doctoral thesis in 1973.

Run time 

Approximation ratio 
Denote by NF(L) the number of bins used by NextFit, and by OPT(L) the optimal number of bins possible for the list L.

Upper bound 
Then, for each list , . The intuition to the proof s the following. The number of bins used by this algorithm is no more than twice the optimal number of bins. In other words, it is impossible for 2 bins to be at most half full because such a possibility implies that at some point, exactly one bin was at most half full and a new one was opened to accommodate an item of size at most . Thus if we have  bins, at least  bins are more than half full. Therefore, . Because  is a lower bound of the optimum value , we get that  and therefore .

Lower bound 

The optimal solution for this list has  bins containing two items with size  and one bin with  items with size  (i.e.,  bins total), while the solution generated by NF has  bins with one item of size  and one item with size .

Bounded item size 

  for all ;
  for all .

Other properties 
Next-Fit packs a list and its inverse into the same number of bins.

Next-k-Fit (NkF) 
Next-k-Fit is a variant of Next-Fit, but instead of keeping only one bin open, the algorithm keeps the last  bins open and chooses the first bin in which the item fits.

For , NkF delivers results that are improved compared to the results of NF, however, increasing  to constant values larger than  improves the algorithm no further in its worst-case behavior.  If algorithm  is an AlmostAnyFit-algorithm and  then .

See also 

 Next-fit-decreasing (NFD) is the offline variant of Next-Fit: it accepts all input items, orders them by descending size, and calls Next-Fit. Its asymptotic approximation ratio is much better: less than 1.7, instead of 2.

References 

Bin packing